"One Day" is a song by Filipino pop and R&B recording artist Charice, now known as Jake Zyrus. The song was co-written and co-produced by American recording artist Nick Jonas. The song was released for digital download on April 19, 2011.

Background

The following day after the release of "Before It Explodes", a follow-up announcement was made by Zyrus.

To promote the song's release, an online competition was launched by Acuvue Contact Lenses. The winners of the contest were given a chance to appear in the music video for the song. The song was used as a part of Acuvue's "ACUVUE 1•DAY Contest".

Music video 

The music video for the song was filmed in Los Angeles on June 17. It premiered on July 27, 2011 on AOL Music's website. In the video, instead of making fun of a teenage boy for drawing a sketch of another boy, his classmates compliment him on his artwork. In another room, two students stay focused and learn not to give up on their dance routine. The video ends with a student from every rung on the high school social ladder engaging in a dance party. Zyrus is seen watching as the events unfold, singing by the staircase and dancing with the students.

A Japanese version of the music video was released on October 19, 2011, and was uploaded on Warner Bros Japan's YouTube channel. In the video, while Zyrus is singing a montage of people pursuing their dreams can be seen behind him. In another scene, while he is walking around the streets he meets a few dancers who later on accompany him in the video. He is then seen at a party surrounded by a crowd of people whose pictures were posted on the montage that was seen earlier in the video. There are also intercut scenes that show them studying and trying to pursue their dreams.

Track listing 

Digital download
"One Day" – 3:13

Release history

External links

References

2011 singles
Jake Zyrus songs
Songs written by Nick Jonas
Songs written by Dan Muckala
Songs written by Jason Ingram
2011 songs
Music videos directed by Marcus Raboy